Bordeaux–Saintes is a one-day road cycling race that takes place between the cities of Bordeaux and Saintes, France. The race was first held in 1909 and has been reserved for amateurs since 1969. In 2005, it was held as a 1.2 event on the UCI Europe Tour.

Winners

References

External links

Cycle races in France
1909 establishments in France
Recurring sporting events established in 1909
UCI Europe Tour races